Khalil Esfandiary-Bakhtiary (April 3, 1901 in Izeh – January 19, 1983 in Munich), was an Iranian politician and diplomat. Bakhtiary was Iran's Ambassador to West Germany from 1952 to 1961. He was the father of Soraya Esfandiary-Bakhtiary, the second wife of Mohammad Reza Pahlavi, the last Shah of Iran.

References

External links
munzinger

1901 births
1983 deaths
Bakhtiari people
Ambassadors of Iran to Germany